Kosse refers to:

Kosse, Texas
Kosse (Königsberg)